D'slove is the second Japanese studio album by D-Lite  (Daesung), member of the South Korean group Big Bang.

D'slove 2014 tour in Japan

To support his album, D-Lite started his second Japanese tour, visiting 9 cities and drew a total of 170,000 fans from 17 shows, D-Lite become the first K-Pop artist to bring in more than 100,000 fans to his concert tour for two consecutive years.

Track listing

Charts

Oricon Charts (Japan)

Release history

References

2014 albums
Avex Group albums
YG Entertainment albums
Daesung albums
Albums produced by G-Dragon